Carlos Céleo Arias López (1835–1890) was President of Honduras from 26 July 1872 until 13 January 1874. His presidency was dominated by the invasion of Honduras by both Guatemala and El Salvador. In spite of putting a strong resistance Arias was forced to give up the presidency in Comayagua.

1835 births
1890 deaths
Presidents of Honduras
Liberal Party of Honduras politicians